Mandrill is an American funk band from Brooklyn, New York, formed in 1968 by brothers Carlos, Lou, and Ric Wilson. AllMusic called them "One of funk's most progressive outfits... [with an] expansive, eclectic vision."

History
The Wilson brothers were born in Panama and grew up in the Bedford–Stuyvesant area of Brooklyn. With Carlos on trombone and vocals, Lou on trumpet and vocals, and Ric on saxophone and vocals, they formed the band to combine funk, soul, jazz, and Latin music. The band was named after the mandrill species of primate, which was known for its colorful features and family-oriented social structure. The other original members included keyboardist Claude "Coffee" Cave, guitarist Omar Mesa, bassist Bundie Cenas, and drummer Charlie Padro.

They signed with Polydor Records and released their self-titled debut album in 1970. The album and its self-titled single "Mandrill" both reached the Billboard charts. Fudgie Kae Solomon replaced Cenas for their second album Mandrill Is, which also reached the Billboard soul and pop charts.

Neftali Santiago then became Mandrill's new drummer. Their third album Composite Truth was released in 1973 and became their most successful release, with the single "Fencewalk" reaching number 19 on the Billboard singles chart. During this period, Mandrill gained critical notice as one of the most progressive and experimental funk bands of the 1970s, while their use of Latin elements drew comparisons to Santana and War. Funk historian Rickey Vincent noted Mandrill's multi-ethnic membership and "bizarre blend of African-based rhythms, scorching rock riffs, country fonk, bop jazz, and one-chord guitar rock operas."

Guitarist Dougie Rodriguez, a former Santana sideman, joined in time for the fifth Mandrill album, Mandrilland, which earned the band another entry on the Billboard R&B Albums chart. In 1975, all members of the group other than the Wilson brothers and Cave departed, and Mandrill switched to United Artists. The albums Solid and Beast from the East were recorded with session musicians. The band then switched to Arista Records and added a fourth Wilson brother, Wilfredo, on bass. Former drummer Neftali Santiago returned and guitarist Joaquin Jessup joined. This lineup released the album We Are One in 1977 and scored their biggest hits in several years with the singles "Funky Monkey" and "Can You Get It." The band released three more albums for Arista, with diminishing success, and stopped recording as a group in 1982.

Lou Wilson died at age 71 in 2013. In 2019 Mandrill announced a new album titled Back In Town. The album was released in October 2020. The current lineup includes Carlos, Ric, and Wilfredo Wilson, plus Marc Rey (lead guitar), Stacy Lamont Sydnor (drums), Derrick Murdock (bass), Eli Brueggeman (keyboards), and Keith Barry (viola, saxophone, flute).

Mandrill songs have been sampled by many hip-hop acts such as Johnny D, Public Enemy, Beck, DJ Shadow, Shawty Lo, Big L, Kanye West, Jin, Eminem, The Avalanches, and 9th Wonder.

Discography

Studio albums
 Mandrill (1970)
 Mandrill Is (1971)
 Composite Truth (1973)
 Just Outside of Town (1973)
 Mandrilland (1974)
 Solid (1975)
 Beast from the East (1976)
 The Greatest (with George Benson) (soundtrack, 1977)
 We Are One (1978)
 New Worlds (1979)
 Getting in the Mood (1980)
 Energize (1981)
 Live at Montreux (2002)
 Back In Town (2020)

Compilations
 The Best of Mandrill (1975)
 Rebirth (1992) 
 Fencewalk: The Anthology (1997)
 The Ultimate Collection (2000)
 Sunshine (2005)

Singles and EPs
 Peace and Love (EP, 2001)
 "Driving While Black and Brown" (single, 2001)
 "Pre-nuclear War Blues" (single, 2004)
 "Sunshine" (soundtrack contribution, 2004)

References

External links

interview on TNJT.com/jazzlive

American funk musical groups
American jazz ensembles from New York City
Musical groups established in 1968
Musical groups from Brooklyn
Panamanian musical groups
Jazz musicians from New York (state)